Solange Andreia Pereira da Ponte (born 16 December 1989) is a Portuguese-Spanish middle-distance runner specialising in the 1500 metres. She represented Spain at the 2017 World Championships without reaching the semifinals. In addition, she reached the final at the 2016 European Championships.

International competitions

Personal bests

Outdoor
400 metres – 57.50 (Vigo 2009)
800 metres – 2:06.18 (Vigo 2013)
1000 metres – 2:45.37 (Pontevedra 2014)
1500 metres – 4:06.39 (Rabat 2017)
3000 metres – 9:23.51 (Barcelona 2012)
5000 metres – 16:46.1 (Getxo 2012)
10 kilometres – 33:52 (Madrid 2016)
Indoor
800 metres – 2:18.78 (A Coruña 2016)
1500 metres – 4:13.54 (Valencia 2017)
3000 metres – 8:55.95 (Valencia 2022)

References

1989 births
Living people
Spanish female middle-distance runners
Portuguese female middle-distance runners
Sportspeople from Galicia (Spain)
World Athletics Championships athletes for Spain
Athletes (track and field) at the 2018 Mediterranean Games
Ibero-American Championships in Athletics winners
Mediterranean Games competitors for Spain